The 2022–23 Edmonton Oilers season is the 44th season for the National Hockey League (NHL) franchise that was established on June 22, 1979, and 51st season for the organization overall, including their play in the World Hockey Association (WHA).

Standings

Divisional standings

Conference standings

Schedule and results

Preseason
The preseason schedule was published on July 5, 2022.

Regular season
The regular season schedule was released on July 6, 2022.

Player statistics
As of March 4, 2023

Skaters

Goaltenders

†Denotes player spent time with another team before joining the Oilers. Stats reflect time with the Oilers only.
‡Denotes player was traded mid-season. Stats reflect time with the Oilers only.

Roster

Transactions
The Oilers have been involved in the following transactions during the 2022–23 season.

Key:

 Contract is entry-level.
 Contract initially takes effect in the 2023–24 season.

Trades

Players acquired

Players lost

Signings

Draft picks

Below are the Edmonton Oilers' selections at the 2022 NHL Entry Draft, which were held on July 7 to 8, 2022. It was held at the Bell Centre in Montreal, Quebec.

References

Edmonton Oilers seasons
Edmonton Oilers
Oilers